Mayfield North is a suburb of Newcastle, New South Wales, Australia.

It is basically an industrial estate, which extends north to the south arm of the Hunter River, west to Tourle Street, and south to Industrial Drive. Originally the estate comprised CSR Chemicals, Titans, Koppers, and part of the BHP Steelworks (No2 Merchant Mill, Rod Mill, Limestone Kiln and Spares Yard). It has officially has population of zero.

History 
The Aboriginal people, in this area, the Awabakal, were the first people of this land.

References

Suburbs of Newcastle, New South Wales